Ranatra australis, the southern water scorpion, is a species of waterscorpion in the family Nepidae. It is found in North America.

References

Articles created by Qbugbot
Insects described in 1922
Nepidae